24 Weeks is a 2016 German drama film directed by Anne Zohra Berrached. It was selected to compete for the Golden Bear at the 66th Berlin International Film Festival.

Cast
 Julia Jentsch as Astrid
 Bjarne Mädel as Markus
 Johanna Gastdorf as Beate
 Emilia Pieske as Nele
 Maria-Victoria Dragus as Kati

References

External links
 

2016 films
2016 drama films
German drama films
2010s German-language films
2010s German films